The 1930 United States Senate special election in Pennsylvania was held on November 4, 1930. Joseph R. Grundy, incumbent Republican appointed to fill the vacancy created by the unseating of William Scott Vare, was defeated for re-nomination. The Republican nominee, James J. Davis, defeated Democratic nominee Sedgwick Kistler to win the election.

Republican primary

Candidates
James J. Davis, former United States Secretary of Labor
Joseph R. Grundy, incumbent U.S. Senator

General election

Candidates
S. W. Bierer (Prohibition)
Emmett Patrick Cush (Communist)
James J. Davis, former United States Secretary of Labor (Republican)
Sedgwick Kistler, member of the Democratic National Committee (Democratic)
William J. Van Essen (Socialist)

Results

See also 
 United States Senate elections, 1930 and 1931

References

Pennsylvania special
1930 special
Pennsylvania 1930
United States Senate 1930
United States Senate special
Pennsylvania 1930